The Diocese of Grand Island is a Latin Church ecclesiastical territory or diocese of the Catholic Church in northwestern and central Nebraska. The cathedra of the Bishop of Grand Island is in Grand Island, Nebraska.
 
It is a suffragan diocese in the ecclesiastical province of the metropolitan Archdiocese of Omaha. The cathedral parish is the Cathedral of the Nativity of the Blessed Virgin Mary, its diocesan headquarters are at 2708 Old Fair Rd., P.O. Box 1531, Grand Island, NE 68802, USA.

The retired bishop of the diocese is Bishop Emeritus William Dendinger. The Rev. Msgr. Joseph G. Hanefeldt was announced as successor on January 14, 2015, and was installed on March 19, 2015.

History 

On January 6, 1857, Pope Pius IX established the Apostolic Vicariate of Nebraska in territory split off from the Apostolic Vicariate of Indian Territory East of the Rocky Mountains.

On March 8, 1912, Pope Pius X established the Diocese of Kearney on territory taken from the then Diocese of Omaha, its present Metropolitan.

The diocese was enlarged with more territory from Omaha on May 13, 1916.
 
On April 11, 1917, the diocese was renamed when the see city was transferred to Grand Island.

The Omaha diocese was elevated to an archdiocese by Pope Pius XII on August 10, 1945.

Bishops

Bishops of Grand Island
The list of bishops who served the diocese and their years of service:
 James Albert Duffy (1913–1931)
 Stanislaus Vincent Bona (1931–1944), appointed Coadjutor Bishop and later Bishop of Green Bay
 Edward Joseph Hunkeler (1945–1951), appointed Bishop and later Archbishop of Kansas City in Kansas
 John Linus Paschang (1951–1972)
 John J. Sullivan (1972–1977), appointed Bishop of Kansas City–Saint Joseph
 Lawrence James McNamara (1978–2004)
 William Joseph Dendinger (2004–2015)
 Joseph G. Hanefeldt (2015–present)

Catholic high schools 
 Central Catholic High School, Grand Island
 Kearney Catholic High School, Kearney
 St. Patrick High School, North Platte
 Spalding Academy, Spalding

See also 

 Catholic Church by country
 Catholic Church in the United States
 Ecclesiastical Province of Omaha
 Global organisation of the Catholic Church
 List of Roman Catholic archdioceses (by country and continent)
 List of Catholic dioceses (alphabetical) (including archdioceses)
 List of Catholic dioceses (structured view) (including archdioceses)
 List of the Catholic dioceses of the United States

References

Sources and external links
 Roman Catholic Diocese of Grand Island
 GigaCatholic, with incumbent biography links

 
Grand Island
Roman Catholic Ecclesiastical Province of Omaha
Christian organizations established in 1912
Grand Island, Nebraska
Grand Island
1912 establishments in Nebraska